Kasare, is a small village in Ahmednagar district of Maharashtra, India. This village is located near Takli Dhokeshwar.

Demographics 
In the 2001 census, the village of Kasare had 1,086 inhabitants, with 518 males (47.7%) and 568 females (52.3%), for a gender ratio of 1097 females per thousand males.

In the 2011 census, the village of Kasare had 1,053 inhabitants, for a net loss of 33 over the preceding decade.

Education

Schools
 Jilha Parishad Prathamik School
Provides education from 1st standard to 7th standard

Religion
The majority of the population in Kasare is Hindu. There are several temples in the village.

Temples
 Shree Biroba Temple
 Shree Mahadev Temple

See also
 Karjule Hareshwar
 Takali Dhokeshwar
 Parner

References 

Villages in Parner taluka
Villages in Ahmednagar district